St. Bernard-Elmwood Place High School is a public high school in St. Bernard, Ohio.  It is the only public high school in the St. Bernard City School District.

Athletics
The Titans are a member of the Miami Valley Conference.

References

External links
 District Website

High schools in Hamilton County, Ohio
Public high schools in Ohio
Public middle schools in Ohio